Richard Séguin (born March 27, 1952 in Pointe-aux-Trembles, Québec Canada) is a Québécois songwriter, musician and singer.

His music career began in the 1970s with the duo Les Séguin, with his twin sister Marie-Claire. The duo achieved considerable popular success in Québec. Their folk reprise of Felix Leclerc's Le train du nord enjoyed huge radio play and record sales, along with other titles. Richard Séguin has led a solo career since 1979, frequently collaborating with his sister Marie Claire on many of her own solo albums.

Séguin has received several prizes, including Felix Awards from the Québec music industry association ADISQ. Some of his albums were certified platinum (sales of over 100 000 copies).

Séguin's songwriting features a delicately intertwined tapestry of blues, folk and rock music influences, feeding from the works of many musicians from Québec and abroad, a reflection of the artist's wide-open range of inspiration. Séguin's lyrics abound with powerful, striking metaphors, illustrating how power relationships not only modify social structures, but personal life as well. A few of his songs have been translated and recorded in English by Gary "U.S." Bonds.

In addition to his lifelong involvement in songwriting, Séguin has also developed considerable skills as a visual artist. His wood engravings borrow altogether from traditional Quebec folk art, Native American Art, German Expressionism and Arte Povera. Some of his work may be seen on his website. In his recent work, Seguin has been largely borrowing and incorporating fragments of poems by Gaston Miron. The mixture reveals to be intricate and complex, and strongly and coherently integrated to the visual patterns of Séguin's work, a brilliant remark of how Miron's poetry may not be dissociated from Québec's life environment.

At many occurrences in the course of his career, Séguin has expressed his complete support for Quebec independence, either within his song lyrics, or in public appearances.

On September 12, 2016, Séguin was the recipient of the prestigious Lifetime Achievement Award at the Francophone SOCAN Awards held in Montreal.

Discography
With Les Séguin
 1973: Séguin
 1974: En attendant
 1975: Récolte de rêves
 1976: Festin d'amour
With Serge Fiori
 1978: Deux cents nuits à l'heure
Solo
 1979: Richard Séguin
 1980: Trace et contraste
 1985: Double vie
 1988: Journée d'Amérique
 1991: Aux portes du matin
 1993: Vagabondage (live album)
 1995: D'instinct
 2000: Microclimat
 2003: Solo
 2006: Lettres ouvertes
 2010: Séguin et le grand choeur (live compilation with a choir of 600)
 2011: Appalaches
 2012: Ma demeure (three-CD compilation, live performance DVD and book set)
 2016: Les horizons nouveaux
 2018: Retour à Walden
In collaboration
 2011: Douze hommes rapaillés (12-artist collective)

References

External links
  Official website

1952 births
Living people
Canadian male singer-songwriters
Songwriters from Quebec
French-language singers of Canada
Singers from Quebec
20th-century Canadian male singers
21st-century Canadian male singers